The 1998 Waveney Council election took place on 7 May 1998 to elect members of Waveney District Council in Suffolk, England. One third of the council was up for election and the Labour Party stayed in overall control of the council.

After the election, the composition of the council was:
Labour 41
Conservative 3
Liberal Democrat 2
Independent 2

Election result

Ward results

Beccles Town

Carlton

Gunton

Harbour

Kessingland

Kirkley

Lothingland

Mutford

Normanston

Oulton Broad

Pakefield

South Elmham

Southwold

St. Margaret's

Wainford

Whitton

References

1998 English local elections
1998
20th century in Suffolk